The Protomycetaceae are a family of fungi in the order Taphrinales. According to a 2008 estimate, the family contains 6 genera and 22 species.

References

Taphrinomycetes
Ascomycota families